Yoga Syahputra, better known as Olga Syahputra, (8 February 1983 – 27 March 2015) was an Indonesian actor, comedian, singer, and television presenter.

Early life
Olga Syahputra was born on 8 February 1983 in Jakarta. He was the eldest child of Nur Rachman and Nurshida. Olga's younger brother, Billy Syahputra, is also a presenter, comedian and actor.

He started his career by joining “Lenong Bocah” with his friend, Ruben Onsu, with whom he used to share a flat.

Career

Syahputra was seen in numerous Indonesian TV programs, especially during the annual Ramadhan festival. He was offered a role in the movie Lenong Bocah. The role required him to take advanced training in Padang-Java  at the Sanggar Ananda owned by Aditya Gumay. Without money, Olga sold a refrigerator to pay for classes. A friend, Bertrand Antolin, later purchased a new refrigerator for him.

He began to get roles in soap operas, including Kawin Gantung and Si Yoyo. He then became a presenter for Ngidam on SCTV paired with Jeremy Thomas. Olga appeared in Jangan Cium Gue, followed by Extravaganza ABG in 2005. By this time, Olga was becoming well known in Indonesia. His breakout year was 2007 when he appeared with Indra Bekti and Indy Barends at the Ceriwis on Trans TV.

In 2008, Olga became a TV presenter of music events on Dahsyat, a morning show on RCTI. His co-presenter since March 2011 was Jessica Iskandar. Olga won the award for Favorite Music/Variety Show Presenter and Favorite Comedian in 2009 Panasonic Awards and 2010 Panasonic Awards. He also starred in such movies as Skandal Cinta Babi Ngepet and Mau Lagi (released as Cintaku Selamanya). 

Olga was reprimanded by the Indonesian Broadcasting Commission (KPI) for off-color remarks he made while hosting the music show Dahsyat on RCTI on May 1, 2009.

Personal life
Olga was a friend of the actor and presenter Raffi Ahmad and brother of Billy Syahputra. He opened a boutique with his sister, Reny Nurman, named "Rumah Olga Syahputra" located in South Jakarta.

Health and death
In April 2014, Olga Syahputra was diagnosed with meningitis. He was treated at Pondok Indah Hospital and in Germany, before going to Singapore, where he was treated at Mount Elizabeth Hospital. He died there at the age of 32 on 27 March 2015.

Discography

Single

Filmography

Film

Television

Comedy shows
 Jangan Cium Gue
 Extravaganza ABG
 New Prime Time
 Saatnya Kita Sahur
 Opera Van Java
 OKB
 Seger Bener
 Sinden Gosip
 Wayang On Stage
 Pesbukers (ANTV)
 Waktunya Kita Sahur (Trans TV)
 Wayang Bandel (Trans TV)
 Yuk Kita Sahur/Yuk Keep Smile/YKS (Trans TV)
 Campur - Campur (ANTV)

Variety, talk and game shows
 Ngidam (SCTV)
 Ceriwis (Trans TV)
 Akhirnya Datang Juga (Trans TV)
 Gong Show (Trans TV)
 Dahsyat (RCTI)
 Dangdut Never Dies (TPI)
 OMG (ANTV)
 Online (Trans TV)
 Piala Dunia Tawa (TPI)
 Apa Ini Apa Itu (RCTI)
 Catatan Si Olga (ANTV)
 Target Operasi (RCTI)
 Korslet (Trans TV)
 Family Minute to Win It Indonesia (Shine TV)

Awards and nominations

References

External links
 Olga Syahputra on Twitter
 

1983 births
2015 deaths
Deaths from meningitis
Neurological disease deaths in Singapore
Infectious disease deaths in Singapore
Male actors from Jakarta
Indonesian male comedians
Indonesian comedians
21st-century Indonesian male singers
Indonesian male television actors
Indonesian pop singers
20th-century Indonesian male actors
Muslim male comedians